Kingswells/Sheddocksley/Summerhill is an electoral ward in Aberdeen. It is one of the thirteen wards used to elect members of the Aberdeen City Council and is currently represented by Steve Delaney of the Liberal Democrats, David John Cameron of the Scottish National Party and Kate Blake of the Labour Party.

Councillors

Election results

Elections in the 2020s

Elections in the 2010s

References

Wards of Aberdeen